Balaram Pota is a census town in Uluberia II CD Block of Uluberia subdivision in Howrah district in the Indian state of West Bengal. It is a part of Kolkata Urban Agglomeration.

Geography
Balaram Pota is located at

Demographics
As per 2011 Census of India Balaram Pota had a total population of 5,544 of which 2,853 (51%) were males and 2,691 (49%) were females. Population below 6 years was 718. The total number of literates in Balaram Pota was 4,354 (90.22% of the population over 6 years).

Balaram Pota was part of Kolkata Urban Agglomeration in 2011 census.

 India census, Balaram Pota had a population of 4,488. Males constitute 52% of the population and females 48%. Balaram Pota has an average literacy rate of 71%, higher than the national average of 59.5%; with 56% of the males and 44% of females literate. 14% of the population is under 6 years of age.

References

Cities and towns in Howrah district
Neighbourhoods in Kolkata
Kolkata Metropolitan Area